The Willi Willi National Park is a protected national park located on the North Coast region of New South Wales, Australia.

The park is part of the Hastings-Macleay group World Heritage Site Gondwana Rainforests of Australia inscribed in 1986 and added to the Australian National Heritage List in 2007.

The park is quite noticeable from nearby  as a tall escarpment to the north west.

This is one of the most beautiful parks in New South Wales. Its diversity offers naturalists everything they need, there are protected species of plants, birds and animals, as well as a beautiful rainforest environment.

See also

 Protected areas of New South Wales

References

External links
 Willi Willi National Park at the NSW National Parks & Wildlife Service

National parks of New South Wales
Protected areas established in 1996
Gondwana Rainforests of Australia
1996 establishments in Australia